Robert Kelly (6 May 1845 – 26 October 1920) was an Australian politician. He was a member of the South Australian House of Assembly from 1891 to 1893, representing the electorate of Wooroora.

Kelly was a farmer at Riverton, before being elected to fill the remainder of the term of his brother, Hugh Craine Kelly, who had died in an accident. He was educated at Adelaide Educational Institution, and already had political experience as a member of the Royal Commission on pastoral lands. He was later to make his mark as one of a triumvirate (with Surveyor-General W. Strawbridge and farmers' representative Ifould) in charge of the Pastoral Board.

References 

1845 births
1920 deaths
Members of the South Australian House of Assembly
People from Riverton, South Australia